"Tonight You Belong to Me" is an American popular song, written in 1926 by lyricist Billy Rose and composer Lee David. The first ever recording was made by Irving Kaufman in 1926 on Banner Records. In 1927 Gene Austin recorded it and the song became a major hit. Another popular recording during this time was by Roger Wolfe Kahn and his Orchestra.

The song was revived by Frankie Laine in 1952, and recorded again in 1956 by Patience and Prudence, whose version reached #4 on the Billboard charts; they recorded it again in 1964.  It was also recorded in 1956 by Lawrence Welk with The Lennon Sisters, and by the duo of Karen Chandler and Jimmy Wakely. In 1964 "Tonight You Belong to Me" was recorded by George Maharis in a sweet swing style on the Epic label.

In 1977, "Tonight You Belong to Me" was recorded by American country music artist Dottie West. It was released as a single, peaking at number 30 on the Billboard Hot Country Singles chart in August 1977. The song was then issued on West's 1977 studio album When It's Just You and Me.

Commercial usage
The version sung by Patience and Prudence was used by eBay as a commercial theme. It was featured in a 2012 TV commercial for Scandinavian Airlines.  This version was also featured in the ending credits of the 2004 film Birth.

In 2011, the Patience and Prudence rendition was featured in four episodes of American Horror Story. The first was in the Pilot episode, as the twins, Troy and Byron, begin trashing the house with baseball bats. The second was during the season finale, "Afterbirth", as the new homeowners run screaming from the home. It was later featured in the series’ eighth-season premiere, “The End as well as the sixth episode "Return to Murder House".”

The song was sung as a duet by Steve Martin and Bernadette Peters in the 1979 film The Jerk, with accompaniment on ukulele and cornet.

The song was covered by Eddie Vedder and Chan Marshall (of Cat Power) on Vedder's second solo album, Ukulele Songs (2011).

The song is featured in a 2013 TV commercial and internet for Milka named "Le dernier carré"

The song was sung by Sutton Foster and Hunter Foster in episode fourteen ("The Astronaut and the Ballerina") of 'Bunheads' (2013). 

In the 2018 the Patience and Prudence version was featured in episode six, entitled "Amour Fou", of Netflix's series,  You_(TV_series).

In the 2019 film ‘’Blackbird,’’ Susan Sarandon, Kate Winslet, and Mia Wasikowska sing it, and their version later plays over the credits.

In 2020, the Patience and Prudence version was featured in episode five, entitled "Strange Case", of HBO's series,  Lovecraft Country.

References

1926 songs
1977 singles
Dottie West songs
Frankie Laine songs
Songs with lyrics by Billy Rose
United Artists Records singles